Darreh Sib (also Romanized as Darreh Sīb) is a village in Ashayer Rural District, in the Central District of Fereydunshahr County, Isfahan Province, Iran. At the 2006 census, its population was 558, in 106 families.

References 

Populated places in Fereydunshahr County